is a town and peninsula located in Fujitsu District, Saga Prefecture, Japan. As of March 1, 2017, the town has an estimated population of 9,125.

Geography
Tara is bordered by Isahaya, Ōmura, Kashima and the Ariake Sea.  On a clear day, it is possible to see the mountains across the sea. Tara includes Mount Tara and Mount Kyoga, which are two of the highest mountains in Kyūshū and part of the Tara Mountains. Tara is composed of two traditional — and to a lesser extent, linguistic — sections, which were once independent towns: Tara (多良) and Ōura (大浦). Tara is located quite close to the Kashima Gatalympics, which takes place near Hizen-Iida station.

Ōura harbor is the main port of entry via sea.

Significant locations
Famous, tourist, and historic sites of note include:

Kinsenji (temple)
Once had influence on shrines throughout Kyūshū, though it is now literally a shell of its former glory (see legends below)

Takezaki Kanze Onji (temple)
Culturally one of the most influential areas in Tara (see festivals, below)

Tara Takezaki onsen
One of the few sources of tourism in modern times

Shirahama beach;
Small and littered with sharp shells, yet facilities exist and a sea-center is close by with recreational activities such as jet-skiing

Kenkou no Mori Park ("forest of health")
A fairly large park in the middle of the mountains

Camp Nakayama
Camping ground with cabins (open for a short period each year) and a trail to Mount Tara and other important areas in the Tara mountains

 and the Tara mountains
Mount Tara is one of the tallest mountains in Kyūshū.

Taller than mount Tara, making it the tallest in the prefecture.  If one is traveling by car, it is more readily accessible from Kashima or Ōmura, though a ridgeline exists between it and mount Tara that hikers often use.

Takezaki Castle Ruins
Degraded into not much more than a wall; its purpose was once to be a lookout for invasions from Nagasaki

Takezaki Castle Observatory
Re-creation of the original Takezaki Castle, this tall structure is at the edge of the peninsula overlooking the sea

Lighthouse Ruins
Reduced to a memorial stone

History
May 1, 1889 — the boundaries of the villages known as Tara, Ōura, and Nanaura were established.
February 11, 1955 — Tara and Ōura became one town, Tara-chō.
March 1, 1955 — a section of Nanaura was absorbed into Tara-chō.

History
Due to influence from Nagasaki, Christianity existed in the area, but after the results of the Shimabara Rebellion, most of the Christians were killed or went underground and became Kakure Kirishitans. The only evidence remaining is grave stones that are scattered throughout Tara.

Legends
Local legend has it that a force from the south once tried to invade Tara.  The villagers wore demon masks to scare the intruders, and won the skirmish.

Another local legend originating in the 9th century is that of a handsome warrior-monk,  Takeno Shintaro, whose looks so charmed the ladies that they sang a song whenever he came down from the mountains. The lyrics of the song ask for him to fall and break his leg so that he would have to stay among the women. Women could not go into the mountains at that time in history because of the mountains' sacred nature. The mountains themselves were worshiped as the realm of gods (at this time the local belief was that gods were another step along a buddha's progression), and the temple at Mount Tara, Kinsen-ji, had authority over more than 70 shrines in Kyūshū. However, under the Meiji restoration, the god-buddha connection became taboo and today Kinsen-ji lies in disrepair. During 1780, a song named "Zanza-bushi" spread through Japan. Saga people adapted the melody and used it to recreate the song "Takeno Shintaro-san".  The first two stanzas:

There is a legend about the origins of the Doro Mochi Tsuki festival (see festivals section below).  In the legend, set about 200 years ago, the village was poor.  On occasion of the village elder being away on a pilgrimage, the town's people all had the same dream. In the mysterious dream, an itinerant monk came to the village as they were discussing how to pray for rain and in hunger stole some mochi.  The villagers blamed him and killed him. Out of regret, they buried him.  Rain fell upon the place where he was buried.  The villagers believed the rain was due to the monk, and offered mochi to him, thus starting the traditional festival.

Festivals and religious occasions
There are many festivals in Tara, some with history spanning back hundreds of years.  These are listed below, in order of date.
January 2 - January 3, : A hadaka matsuri at Takezaki Kanzeon temple wherein men dressed in loincloths try to stop a man dressed as an oni, who carries a box.  The men then pull at the oni and shred the red kimono the oni wears. There is also a dance by boys in costumes.
January 8, : This matsuri is an archery event in the Ochiyōzu district in which the participants wield bows and arrows made out of green bamboo. Words like "east", "west", "south", "north" and "oni" are written on the targets. 33,333 arrows are said to be shot metaphorically, though the actual number is much less.  3 is a number that carries connotations of innocent omens in the festival, therefore the figure.
Mid January, : A children's festival at Takezaki Kanzeon temple in which they take round straw mats and pierce them with long spears.  Then they take the luck of the new year upon themselves and make wishes.
January 14, : A children’s festival in which they go around carrying sticks with straw wrapped around the end.  They chant, "!", a ritual saying, as they strike the ground in unison.  This drives away bad luck and invites fortune.  This type of festival happens in other places in Japan.
April 1, : To honor their ancestors, people dress as white foxes and perform a synchronized dance.
Mid May, : A Buddhist ceremony in Takezaki Kanzeon temple and around the coast that appeases the force in charge of the catch and prays for a safe fishing season.  During the ceremony a monk travels along the coast, ringing gongs and beating drums, while chanting a sutra in honor of a bodhi ancestor that is interred at Takezaki Kanzeon temple. This ceremony is more than 400 years old.
End of July, beginning of August : At night the town gathers on Michikoshi beach and dances, O-bon-style, in a giant ring.  Many people wear yukata. There are also fireworks.  This is a relatively new festival, but arguably the biggest in Tara. Many events happen at the same time, and traditional matsuri stands are set up, allowing access to festival foods and games.
2nd Saturday and Sunday of September, : At Tara-dake Shrine and throughout Tara for a few weeks, people give thanks for (and for ensuring for the prosperity of another) a big harvest. People excitedly dance around in black outfits and wear oni masks.  They also carry drums and cymbals and beat taiko drums.  This is said to be the oldest of Tara's festivals and traditions.
September 22, : A muddy, mochi-pounding festival at Itoki Kabuta, in which men wearing fundoshi battle each other on a slippery mud field of red-clay while pounding mochi (see above for origins of this matsuri). The muddy mochi made in the event is then offered on a plate to a statue of Yakushi Nyorai.

Other events
January 4, : To celebrate the return of spring, runners from Tara and other places gather in front of Tara elementary school and run a marathon.
July 10: Shirahama beach officially opens
July 21: Camp Nakayama opens to the public.
End of July through the beginning of August, . Held in Tagori, kids come from all over Japan to have their pet beetles fight in little rings on the tops of logs.  The beetle that falls of the log loses.

Discontinued festivals and traditions
Some festivals have recently stopped being performed, or are rarely observed anymore.  Among them are: the cucumber festival, in which cucumbers were piled in hopes of blessings such as safety and babies, and the demon fires events, in which large bonfires were made.

Industry

Tara was once a thriving tourist destination, but as Japan's economy has slowed down, so has Tara's.  Most young people relocate to the larger cities when they become adults.  Tara is on a main railroad line and traversed by route 207 (see transportation below), and benefits somewhat from the tourism this brings.  As a result, many people in Tara are opposed to new train lines that would make commerce through Tara all but obsolete.  However planning has gone ahead, and Tara has received a payoff to compensate.

It is regionally famous for its crabs (of the wanigani variety), mikans, and oysters, the latter of which is in season during the winter.  During oyster (or kaki) season, it is common for people to come from surrounding prefectures and enjoy grilled kaki.  Many restaurants have special, bare-bones plastic and wood sections that are only open during this season.  Most of such business happens on the weekends, and this is also a good business time for the local farmer's market.

Other industry in Tara includes animal husbandry, especially chicken farms, and forestry.  But Tara's most profitable industry probably lies in the surrounding sea.  Besides fishing and marine life, Tara boasts thousands of nori collecting poles and nets.

Education
Tara has one prefectural highschool, Tara High School (佐賀県立太良高等学校), and two junior high schools.  There are also two elementary schools and scattered kindergartens.

Transportation
Most travelers come to Tara by National Route 207 or via the Nagasaki Main Line, operated by JR Kyushu.

Stations
Tara is serviced by the JR Kyushu railroad company.  It has two stations and one switchbox.
Nagasaki Main Line
Tara Station
Hizen-Ōura Station

Air
The closest airport is Saga Airport, followed by one in Nagasaki.  Most travelers go to Fukuoka Airport for travel abroad.

Roads
National Route 207 runs through the length of the town, and is the only road to Nagasaki Prefecture. The mountains are seeded with small roads, many of them one lane and unpaved.  A road leads from camp Nakayama towards Kashima and Ureshino.

Sea
While fishing is a huge industry, there is no known sea travel, nor are there ferries available.

Language
While standard Japanese is spoken and understood in the area, the locals also speak the local dialect, Saga-ben, which is further broken down into Tara-ben and Ōura-ben.  Some examples of speech include:
"dōgan", or the even older and more rustic "dōgyan"; approximately equivalent to standard Japanese's "dō" (how).
Extremely common words that end in "re" have "re" replaced by "i".  For instance, "kore" = "koi", "ore" = "oi" etc.
"Kyu kyan ba" means "I have to eat it today"
"Soigi ne" (in the Tara quarter) and "Aigi ne" (in Ōura) are the local equivalent to "ja ne", or in English "see you later". "Soigi" is generally substituted where standard Japanese's "ja" or "de wa" would be.

References

External links

 Tara official website 
Exploring the Tara mountains A guide to various hiking and rock-climbing routes in the area.
 Guide to Tara Festivals 
 Tara Event info

Towns in Saga Prefecture